Paper Monkeys is the thirteenth studio album by English psychedelic rock band Ozric Tentacles, released on 10 October 2011 by Snapper Music.

Track listing

Personnel
 Ed Wynne - guitar, synthesizer, programming, production, engineering
 Silas Neptune - keyboards
 Oliver Seagle - drums, percussion
 Brandi Wynne - bass, production, engineering
 Jim Wilson - mastering

References

External links
 Paper Monkeys at Allmusic
 Paper Monkeys at Madfishmusic

2011 albums
Ozric Tentacles albums